USS Elf (SP-81) was an armed motorboat that served in the United States Navy as a patrol vessel from 1917 to 1919.
 
Elf was a civilian motorboat completed in early 1917 by Stanley Vansant. In early May 1917, the U.S. Navy acquired her under a free lease from her owner, Louis H. Eisenlohr of Philadelphia, Pennsylvania, for World War I service as a patrol boat.  She was commissioned as USS Elf (SP-81) on 3 May 1917.

Elf performed patrol duty in the 4th Naval District until July 1918, when she was transferred to the 7th Naval District.

Elf was decommissioned on 9 January 1919 and returned to her owner on 10 January 1919.

References

Department of the Navy: Naval Historical Center: Online Library of Selected Images: Civilian Ships: Elf (American Motor Boat, 1917). Served as USS Elf (SP-81) in 1917-1919
NavSource Online: Section Patrol Craft Photo Archive: Elf (SP 81)

Patrol vessels of the United States Navy
World War I patrol vessels of the United States
1917 ships